The Northern Cape Department of Roads and Public Works is the department of the Government of the Northern Cape responsible for maintaining public infrastructure within the Northern Cape province of South Africa. The MEC of this department is Fufe Makatong.

References

External links
Northern Cape Department: Roads and Public Works
NC Dept of Roads and Public Works

Government of the Northern Cape
Public works ministries
Northern Cape